Anzan-e Sharqi Rural District is a rural district (dehestan) in the Central District of Bandar-e Gaz County, Golestan Province, Iran. At the 2006 census, its population was 7,101, in 1,718 families.  The rural district has 10 villages.

References 

Rural Districts of Golestan Province
Bandar-e Gaz County